Guglielmetti is an Italian surname. Notable people with the surname include:

Matthew Guglielmetti (born 1949), American mobster
Savino Guglielmetti (1911–2006), Italian gymnast

See also
Guglielmelli

Italian-language surnames
Patronymic surnames
Surnames from given names